is a Japanese football player currently playing for Gainare Tottori.

Club career stats
Updated to 23 February 2016.

References

External links

Profile at Gainare Tottori

1986 births
Living people
Aoyama Gakuin University alumni
Association football people from Saitama Prefecture
Japanese footballers
J2 League players
J3 League players
Japan Football League players
Tochigi SC players
Giravanz Kitakyushu players
Matsumoto Yamaga FC players
AC Nagano Parceiro players
Gainare Tottori players
Association football defenders